Walbach may refer to:

 John de Barth Walbach (1766-1857), an Alsatian baron
 Walbach, Haut-Rhin, a commune in the Haut-Rhin department in north-eastern France
 Château de Walbach, in the Haut-Rhin department in north-eastern France
 Walbach (Agger), a river of North Rhine-Westphalia, Germany, tributary of the Agger
 Camp Walbach, Northwest of Cheyenne, Wyoming, USA, established 1858, abandoned 1859

See also
Wallbach (disambiguation)
Wahlbach (disambiguation)